Richard Bellamy (1825–1892) was a farmer, land surveyor and politician in New Brunswick, Canada. He represented York County in the Legislative Assembly of New Brunswick from 1886 to 1890 as a Liberal member.

He was born in London, England and educated there. Bellamy came to New Brunswick as a "Blue Coat Boy", a juvenile emigrant. Later, he was also involved in the lumber trade. His reelection in 1890 was appealed and he lost the subsequent by-election. In 1891, Bellmay was named to the province's Executive Council. He died in office the following year.

References 
The Canadian parliamentary companion, 1889 JA Gemmill

1825 births
1892 deaths
New Brunswick Liberal Association MLAs